Ijaz Mirza (14 May 1941 – 7 April 2013) was a Pakistani cricketer. He played first-class cricket for Karachi and National Bank of Pakistan between 1962 and 1972. He also served as a selector of the Karachi City Cricket Association (KCCA).

References

External links
 

1941 births
2013 deaths
Pakistani cricketers
Karachi cricketers
National Bank of Pakistan cricketers
Cricketers from Delhi